In mathematics, for a Lie group , the Kirillov orbit method gives a heuristic method in representation theory. It connects the Fourier transforms of coadjoint orbits, which lie in the dual space of the Lie algebra of G, to the infinitesimal characters of the irreducible representations. The method got its name after the Russian mathematician Alexandre Kirillov.

It does not apply to all Lie groups, but works for a number of classes of connected Lie groups, including nilpotent, some semisimple groups, and compact groups.

The Kirillov orbit method has led to a number of important developments in Lie theory, including the Duflo isomorphism and the wrapping map.

Character formula for compact Lie groups 

Let  be the highest weight of an irreducible representation , where  is the dual of the Lie algebra of the maximal torus, and let  be half the sum of the positive roots.

If  is the character of the representation, the Kirillov's character formula for compact Lie groups is given by

,

where  is the Jacobian of the exponential map.

Example: SU(2) 

The coadjoint orbits are the two-dimensional spheres of radius , centered at the origin in 3-dimensional space.

By the theory of Bessel functions, it may be shown that

and

thus yielding the characters of SU(2):

References 
Kirillov, A. A., Lectures on the Orbit Method, Graduate Studies in Mathematics, 64, AMS, Rhode Island, 2004.
Representation theory of Lie groups